3-Methylpentane is a branched alkane with the molecular formula C6H14. It is a structural isomer of hexane composed of a methyl group bonded to the third carbon atom in a pentane chain. It is of similar structure to the isomeric 2-methylpentane, which has the methyl group located on the second carbon of the pentane chain.

References

External links
 Material Safety Data Sheet for 3-Methylpentane

Alkanes